General Tomás Miguel Guardia Gutiérrez (December 16, 1831 – July 6, 1882) was President of Costa Rica on two occasions: from 1870 to 1876, and from 1877 to 1882.

On 27 April 1870 Tomás Guardia was one of a group of army officers who deposed President Jesús Jiménez. He was the power behind the throne during the very short presidency of his conspirator Bruno Carranza, whom he replaced after a period of three months.

The following year he enacted Costa Rica's 1871 Constitution, which remained in force until 1948.

On 8 May 1876 he surrendered the presidency to  Aniceto Esquivel. He continued to pull the strings of power during Esquivel's short term in office and that of Esquivel's successor Vicente Herrera, before reassuming the presidency himself on 11 September 1877. He abolished the death penalty later that year.

He remained in office until his death.

References

1831 births
1882 deaths
People from Guanacaste Province
Costa Rican people of Spanish descent
Presidents of Costa Rica
Vice presidents of Costa Rica
19th-century Costa Rican people
Costa Rican liberals